Karol Tadeusz Nawrocki (born March 3, 1983, in Gdańsk) is a Polish historian.

He is the current head of the Institute of National Remembrance (IPN).

He also served as the director of the Museum of the Second World War in Gdańsk from 2017 to 2021.

Career
Nawrocki graduated from the Faculty of History at the University of Gdańsk where he earned his PhD in 2013.

He worked at the Institute of National Remembrance in the years 2009–2017, heading its Branch Public Education Office in Gdańsk from 2013 to 2017. He also served as the chairman of the Siedlce District Council in Gdańsk between 2011 and 2017.

In 2017, he was appointed the director of the Museum of the Second World War in Gdańsk, a job he held until 2021. He then returned to the Institute of National Remembrance, becoming its deputy president in June 2021. In July 2021, he took office as the IPN's new head after being elected by the Sejm and approved by the Senate of Poland.

Nawrocki is the author or co-author of several books as well as numerous scientific and popular science papers on anticommunist opposition, organised crime in the Polish People's Republic and the history of sports.

Honors
In 2016, he was awarded the Bronze Cross of Merit of the Republic of Poland. In 2021, the Silver Cross of Merit followed.

References 

1983 births
21st-century Polish historians
Living people
University of Gdańsk alumni
Writers from Gdańsk